Wahrmund is a surname. Notable people with the surname include:

 Adolf Wahrmund (1827–1913), Austrian-German orientalist
 Ludwig Wahrmund (1860–1932), Austrian professor
 Jackie Wahrmund (1860–1932), Lecturer at University of Kentucky  
 

German-language surnames